Joshua Gibson Booty (born April 29, 1975) is a former professional baseball and American football player. Booty played briefly in Major League Baseball (MLB) as a third baseman, and also in the National Football League (NFL) as a quarterback.

High school (1990–1994)
Booty went to Evangel Christian Academy in Shreveport, Louisiana. Josh's father Johnny was an All-American high school football player as well at Shreveport's Woodlawn High School (which produced NFL quarterbacks Terry Bradshaw and Joe Ferguson in the 1960s), and was the athletic director at Evangel Christian. He was also one of the founders of the Evangel school that turned into a football factory. Booty was named to the All-Time National High School All-American team by Dick Butkus. Joe Namath, and John Elway were the other two QB's mentioned on the All-Time team.

As quarterback for the football team, he threw for 11,700 yards and 126 touchdowns, becoming the first high school player in history to throw for more than 10,000 yards (despite missing the last four games of his senior year because of a broken hand). Booty was named the USA Today Offensive Player of the Year and was named the National High School Player of the Year by at least six associations, including Parade and the Football News.

Evangel won the Louisiana High School Athletic Association Class 1A state championship in 1993, the first of 11 the Eagles would win between 1993 and 2006.

Booty's main competition for the 1993 awards was Peyton Manning, who was then a senior at Isidore Newman School in New Orleans.

As a shortstop for the baseball team, he was a four-time All-State choice at shortstop. As a senior, he batted .429 with 20 intentional walks, 25 stolen bases, and 12 home runs in 70 at bats. He was the starting shortstop for the U.S. Junior Olympic National Team that won the silver medal. He was a USA Today All-American shortstop. Booty won a silver medal in the 1993 U.S. Olympic Festival. He was the 5th pick overall in the 1994 Major League Baseball Draft by the Florida Marlins.

Highly recruited by major college football programs from across the country, Booty decided to sign with the Marlins for a then-record $1.6 million signing bonus.

Baseball career (1994–1998)
Booty was the fifth pick overall in the first round of the Major League Baseball Amateur Draft (1994). Booty spent five years in the Marlins organization, and was a career .269 hitter in the major leagues. The Marlins reportedly paid him $1.6 million, a then draft signing bonus record,  if he did not play football in the duration of his contract, but he decided to pursue a career in pro football. He hit 20-plus home runs in single and double A minor league stops and was voted the Minor League Defensive Player of the Year in 1997 for the Portland Sea Dogs. He hit .198 in his minor league career.

In 2013, Booty spent spring training in Arizona with the Arizona Diamondbacks as a knuckleball pitcher after winning MLB Network's reality show The Next Knuckler.

College football career (1999–2000)
In 1999, Booty went to Louisiana State University (LSU) to play football for LSU's football team. He signed with LSU in February 1994 to play football for then-coach Curley Hallman, but instead signed a baseball contract.

During two years there, he completed 49.3% of his passes for 3,951 yards and 24 touchdowns.

Freshman season
Booty beat out two future NFL draft picks, Craig Nall and Rohan Davey, for the starting job. The Tigers did not have much success, and head coach Gerry DiNardo was fired during the season.

Sophomore season
During his sophomore season (2000), under Coach Nick Saban, Booty started the first four games of the season.

In LSU's 58–0 victory over Western Carolina he completed 80.0% of his passes for 291 yards, throwing two touchdowns and no interceptions. In LSU's 28–13 victory over Houston he completed 44.0% of his passes for 175 yards, throwing two touchdowns and two interceptions. In LSU's 34-17 loss to No. 24 Auburn he completed 44.8% of his passes for 214 yards, throwing two touchdowns and one interception. In LSU's 13-10 loss to UAB he completed 39.5% of his passes for 156 yards. He threw an interception along the left sideline on what turned out to be the Tigers' final offensive play of the game, turning the ball over to the Blazers in field goal range. UAB won on a 32-yard Rhett Gallego field goal with no time left.

Booty did not play in next game against No. 11 Tennessee because of a rib injury. Davey quarterbacked a 38–31 overtime victory over Tennessee in Tiger Stadium. Davey only completed 33.3% of his passes against Florida, throwing no touchdowns and one interception, so Booty took over with 10:32 left in the third quarter while the score was Florida 24, LSU 3. Booty finished the game, completing 62.5% of his passes for 184 yards, throwing one touchdown. The final score was Florida 41, LSU 9.

Booty was starting quarterback for the rest of the season:
LSU's 34–0 victory over Kentucky (completing 45.5% of his passes for 225 yards, throwing three touchdowns and no interceptions)
LSU's 45–38 OT victory over #13 Mississippi State (completing 63.2% of his passes for 246 yards, throwing two touchdowns, and one interception)
LSU's 30–28 victory over Alabama (completing 58.1% of his passes for 275 yards, throwing for four touchdowns and no interceptions). This competition is known as the "It's About Time" game because it was the first time in 31 years that LSU had defeated Alabama at home.
LSU's 20–9 victory at Ole Miss (completing 53.3% of his passes for 290 yards, throwing one touchdown and no interceptions)
LSU's 14-3 loss to Arkansas (completing 22.2% of his passes for 65 yards, throwing no touchdowns and two interceptions) in pouring rain and windy conditions

During Booty's nine games as a starter, LSU went 6–3, as Booty threw 17 touchdowns and 14 interceptions. Booty finished his sophomore season throwing for 2,121 yards, which at the time was the third-best performance by a sophomore in LSU history, behind Jeff Wickersham's 1983 sophomore season (2,542 yards) and Tommy Hodson's 1987 sophomore season (2,125 yards). Booty was voted to the first-team All-SEC Team, becoming the first LSU quarterback to be awarded that honor since Tommy Hodson.

At the end of the 2000 season, LSU went to the Peach Bowl and posted a 28–14 victory over No. 15 Georgia Tech. Booty played the first half and completed 42.1% of his passes for no touchdowns and no interceptions. Trailing 14-3 at halftime, Saban yanked Booty and inserted Davey, who helped LSU outscore the Yellow Jackets 25-0 in the second half.

Professional football career

Booty was taken as the 177th pick (6th round) of the 2001 NFL Draft by the Seattle Seahawks.

Booty signed with the Cleveland Browns in 2001 but was waived in 2003.

Personal life
One of Booty's younger brothers, Abram, was a wide receiver at LSU (1997–1999), Valdosta State University (2000) and a Cleveland Browns wide receiver in 2001. Another brother, John David, was the starting quarterback at USC in 2007, and was drafted by the Minnesota Vikings in 2008. John David quarterbacked USC's victories over Michigan and Illinois in the 2007 and 2008 Rose Bowls, respectively.

He was formerly the spokesperson for TrueMRI in Beverly Hills, California, and has been involved with numerous radio and television commentating work in sports, including Sirius, Fox Sports, ESPN Radio.

Josh won the MLB Network reality show "The Next Knuckler", hosted by former Boston Red Sox players Tim Wakefield and Kevin Millar. The show also included football players Doug Flutie, John David Booty, David Greene, and Ryan Perrilloux. For winning, he got a chance to go to spring training with the Arizona Diamondbacks as a pitcher, even though his baseball rights technically still belonged to the Marlins. He struggled with his command while pitching in minor league spring training games and was released on March 28.

References

External links

1975 births
Living people
Players of American football from Louisiana
Players of American football from Mississippi
Evangel Christian Academy alumni
LSU Tigers football players
Cleveland Browns players
Florida Marlins players
Baseball players from Mississippi
Major League Baseball third basemen
Gulf Coast Marlins players
Elmira Pioneers players
Kane County Cougars players
Portland Sea Dogs players
Charlotte Knights players
Sportspeople from Starkville, Mississippi
Seattle Seahawks players
Oakland Raiders players